Lotty is an English feminine given name that is a diminutive form of Charlotte or Lieselotte, an alternate form of Lotte, and that is also related to Lisa, Elisa and Elisabeth. Notable people with the name include the following:

Given name
Lotty Ipinza (born 1953), Venezuelan poet and singer

Nickname
Lotty Hough, real name Charlotte Hough (c. 1833–1896), American actress and comedian
Lotty Rosenfeld, full name Carlota Eugenia Rosenfeld Villarreal (1943–2020), Chliean artist

Surname
 Alan Lotty (1920 – 1973), Irish hurler

See also

Letty (disambiguation)
Lofty (disambiguation)
Lott (disambiguation)
Lotta (name)
Lotte (name)
Lotti (given name)
Lotto (disambiguation)

Notes

English feminine given names